The surname Spring is shared by:

 Amos Spring (1880–1958), English cricketer
 Antoine Frédéric Spring (1814–1872), Belgian physician and botanist
 Arthur Spring (born 1976), Irish Labour Party politician
 Bryan Spring (born 1945), British jazz drummer
 Charles A. Spring (1800–1892), American merchant and religious leader
 Christopher Spring (born 1984), Canadian bobsledder
 Cecil Spring Rice (1859–1918), British diplomat
 Dick Spring (born 1950), Irish businessman and politician
 Dryden Spring (born 1939), New Zealand businessman
 George E. Spring (1859–1917), New York state senator
 Howard Spring (1889–1965), Welsh author
 Jack Spring (1933–2015), American baseball pitcher
 Marianna Spring, British journalist
 Richard Spring, Baron Risby (born 1946), British politician
 Rudi Spring (born 1962), German pianist and composer
 Samuel Spring (1746–1819), American Revolutionary War chaplain and Congregationalist minister.
 Samuel N. Spring (1875–1952), American silviculturist and academic administrator.
 Sherwood C. Spring (born 1944), United States Army officer and astronaut
 Tom Spring (1795–1851) English bare-knuckle fighter and English heavy weight champion
 Tori Spring Meme Queen.
 Walthère Victor Spring (1848–1911), Belgian chemist

See also
 Spring family
 Spring baronets
 Spring (disambiguation)